The Cedars of God ( Arz al-Rabb "Cedars of the Lord"), located in the Kadisha Valley of Bsharre, Lebanon, are one of the last vestiges of the extensive forests of the Lebanon cedar that thrived across Mount Lebanon in antiquity. All early modern travelers' accounts of the wild cedars appear to refer to the ones in Bsharri; the Christian monks of the monasteries in the Kadisha Valley venerated the trees for centuries. The earliest documented references of the Cedars of God are found in Tablets 4-6 of the great Epic of Gilgamesh, six days walk from Uruk.

The Phoenicians, Israelites, Egyptians, Assyrians, Babylonians, Persians, Romans, Arabs, and Turks used Lebanese timber. The Egyptians valued their timber for shipbuilding, and in the Ottoman Empire their timber was used to construct railways.

History

Ancient history
The mountains of Lebanon were once shaded by thick cedar forests and the tree is the symbol of the country. After centuries of persistent deforestation, the extent of these forests has been markedly reduced.

It was once said that a battle occurred between the demigods and the humans over the beautiful and divine forest of Cedar trees near southern Mesopotamia.  This forest, once protected by the Sumerian god Enlil, was completely bared of its trees when humans entered its grounds 4700 years ago, after winning the battle against the guardians of the forest, the demigods.  The story also tells that Gilgamesh used cedar wood to build his city.

Over the centuries, cedar wood was exploited by the Phoenicians, Egyptians, Israelites, Assyrians, Babylonians, Persians, Romans, Arabs, and Turks.  The Phoenicians used the Cedars for their merchant fleets. They needed timbers for their ships and the Cedar woods made them the “first sea trading nation in the world”. The Egyptians used cedar resin for the mummification process and the cedar wood for some of “their first hieroglyph bearing rolls of papyrus”.  In the Bible, Solomon procured cedar timber to build the Temple in Jerusalem.  The emperor Hadrian claimed these forests as an imperial domain, and destruction of the cedar forests was temporarily halted.

Early modern history
All early modern travelers' accounts of the wild cedars of Lebanon appear to refer to the Bsharri cedars.

Pierre Belon visited the area in 1550, making him the first modern traveler to identify the Cedars of God in his ‘’Observations’’. Belon counted 28 trees:
“At a considerable height up the mountains the traveler arrives at the Monastery of the Virgin Mary, which is situated in the valley. Thence proceeding four miles up the mountain, he will arrive at the cedars, the Maronites or the monks acting as guides. The cedars stand in a valley, and not on top of the mountain, and they are supposed to amount to 28 in number, though it is difficult to count them, they being distant from each other a few paces. These the Archbishop of Damascus has endeavored to prove to be the same that Solomon planted with his own hands in the quincunx manner as they now stand. No other tree grows in the valley in which they are situated and it is generally so covered with snow as to be only accessible in summer".

Leonhard Rauwolf followed in 1573-75, counting 24 trees:
 “saw nothing higher, but only a small hill before us, all covered with snow, at the bottom whereof the high cedar trees were standing… And, although this hill hath, in former ages, been quite covered with cedars, yet they are since so decreased, that I could tell no more but twenty-four that stood round about in a circle and two others, the branches whereof are quite decayed for age. I also went about this place to look for young ones, but could find none at all". 

Jean de Thévenot counted 23 trees in 1655: 
"It is a Fobbery to say, that if one reckon the Cedars of Mount Lebanon twice, he shall have a different number, for in all, great and small, there is neither more or less than twenty three of them". 

Laurent d'Arvieux in 1660 counted 20 trees; and Henry Maundrell in 1697 counted 16 trees of the “very old” type:
“Sunday, May 9 The noble (cedar] trees grow amongst the snow near the highest part of Lebanon; and are remarkable as well as for their own age and largeness, as for those frequent allusions made to them in the word of God. Here are some of them very old, and of prodigious bulk; and others younger of a smaller size. Of the former I could reckon up only sixteen, and the latter are very numerous. I measured one of the largest, and found it twelve yards six inches in girt, and yet sound; and thirty seven yards in the spread of its boughs. At about five or six yards from the ground, it was divided into five limbs, each of which was equal to a great tree. After about half an hour spent surveying this place, the clouds began to thicken, and to fly along upon the ground; which so obscured the road, that my guide was very much at a loss to find our way back again. We rambled about for seven hours thus bewildered, which gave me no small fear of being forc'd to spend one night more on Libanus". 

Jean de la Roque in 1722 found 20 trees. In 1738 Richard Pococke provided a detailed description. 
"They form a grove about a mile in circumference, which consists of some large cedars that are near to one another, a great number of young cedars and some pines. The great cedars, at some distance, look very like large spreading oaks; the bodies of the trees are short, dividing at the bottom into three or four limbs, some of which growing up together for about ten feet, appear something like thick Gothic columns, which seem to be composed of seven pillars, higher up they begin to spread horizontally: one that had the rounded body, tho' not the largest, measured twenty four feet in circumference, and another with a sort of triple body, as described above, and of a triangular figure, measured twelve feet on each side. The young cedars are not easily know they bear a greater quantity of fruit than the larger ones. The wood does not differ from white deal in appearance, nor does it seem to be harder; it has a fine smell, but not so fragrant as the juniper of America which is commonly called cedar; and it also falls short of it in beauty; I took a piece of the wood from a great tree that was blown down by the wind, and left there to rot; there are fifteen large ones standing. The Christians of several denominations near this place come here to celebrate the festival of the transfiguration, and have built altars against several of the large trees, on which they administer the sacrament. These trees are about half a mile to the north of the road to which we returned...”

From the 19th century onwards, the number of writers recording their visits increased substantially, and the number of cedars counted by the writers was in hundreds. Alphonse de Lamartine visited the place during his travel in Lebanon (1832–33), mentioning the cedars in some texts. In 1871, Edward Henry Palmer of the Palestine Exploration Fund described the cedars as follows:

Descending by a steep zigzag path to the cedars, we pitched our camp and proceeded to examine the sacred and renowned grove, and could not repress a feeling of disappointment at its small extent, and the insignificant appearance of the trees. They consist of a little clump of trees of comparatively modern growth, not more than nine of them showing any indications of a respectable antiquity, and covering only about three acres of ground. They stand on a ridge consisting of five mounds and two spurs running nearly east and west, as in the accompanying plan. The whole number of trees we estimated at about 355; their size has also been grossly exaggerated, none of them being over 80ft. high. The ground is covered with débris of cedar and white limestone, and in the centre of the clump is a hideous little building, a Maronite chapel, the appointments of which are painfully poverty-stricken and inadequate. The trees have been lopped and otherwise maltreated, especially by the irrepressible tourist, who has been at infinite pains to cut his name on every available trunk. One tree, rather a large one, has a hole in it where a branch had broken away, and this has been enlarged into a chamber. They are scrubby scanty specimens, and not half so fine as may be seen in many an English park.

Concern for the protection of the biblical "cedars of God" goes back to 1876, when the  grove was surrounded by a high stone wall, paid for by Queen Victoria, to protect saplings from browsing by goats. Nevertheless, during World War I, British troops used cedar to build railroads.

Henry Bordeaux came in 1922 and wrote, Yamilé, a story about the place.

Recent history
Time, along with the exploitation of the Cedars’ wood and the effects of climate change, has led to a decrease in the number of cedar trees in Lebanon. However, Lebanon is still widely known for its cedar tree history, as they are the emblem of the country and the symbol of the Lebanese flag. The remaining trees survive in mountainous areas, where they are the dominant tree species.

World Heritage Site
In 1998, the Cedars of God were added to the UNESCO list of World Heritage Sites.

Current status
The forest is rigorously protected. It is possible to tour if escorted by an authorized guide. After a preliminary phase in which the land was cleared of detritus, the sick plants treated, and the ground fertilized, the "Committee of the Friends of the Cedar Forest" initiated a reforestation program in 1985. These efforts will only be appreciable in a few decades due to the slow growth of cedars. In these areas the winter offers incredible scenery, and the trees are covered with a blanket of snow.

Biblical and other ancient references
The Cedar Forest of ancient Mesopotamian religion appears in several sections of the Epic of Gilgamesh.

The Lebanon Cedar is mentioned 103 times in the Bible. In the Hebrew text it is named  and in the Greek text (LXX) it is named . Example verses include:
 "Open thy doors, O Lebanon, that the fire may devour thy cedars. Howl, fir tree; for the cedar is fallen; because the mighty are spoiled: howl, O ye oaks of Bashan; for the forest of the vintage is come down." (Zechariah 11:1, 2)
 "He moves his tail like a cedar; The sinews of his thighs are tightly knit." (Job 40:17)
 "The priest shall take cedarwood and hyssop and scarlet stuff, and cast them into the midst of the burning of the heifer" (Numbers 19:6)
 "The voice of the Lord breaks the cedars; the Lord breaks in pieces the cedars of Lebanon" (Psalm 29:5)
 "The righteous flourish like the palm tree and grow like the cedar in Lebanon" (Psalm 92:12)
 "I will put in the wilderness the cedar, the acacia, the myrtle, and the olive" (Isaiah 41: 19)
 "Behold, I will liken you to a cedar in Lebanon, with fair branches and forest shade" (Ezekiel 31:3)
 "I destroyed the Amorite before them, whose height was like the height of the cedars" (Amos 2:9)
"The trees of the Lord are watered abundantly, the cedars of Lebanon that he planted." (Psalm 104:16 NRSV)
[King Solomon made] cedar as plentiful as the sycamore-fig trees in the foothills. (1 Kings 10:27, NIV, excerpt)

Gallery

See also

 Garden of the Gods
 Al Shouf Cedar Nature Reserve
 List of individual trees

References

Bibliography
 
 Aiello, Anthony S., and Michael S. Dosmann. "The quest for the Hardy Cedar-of-lebanon." Arnoldia: The magazine of the Arnold Arboretum 65.1 (2007): 26–35.
 Anderson, Mary Perle. “The Cedar of Lebanon.” Torreya, vol. 8, no. 12, 1908, pp. 287–292. JSTOR, www.jstor.org/stable/40594656.

External links
 Lebanon eco-tourism: Cedars of God

Cedrus
Old-growth forests
Forests of Lebanon
Sacred groves
Environment of Lebanon
World Heritage Sites in Lebanon
Epic of Gilgamesh
Tourist attractions in Lebanon
Tourism in Lebanon
Oldest trees